Tripolis (meaning "three cities") was a district in ancient Laconia, Greece, southeast of Megalopolis, comprising the three cities of Belmina, Aegys, and Pellana.

External links
Hazlitt, Classical Gazetteer, "Tripolis"

Geography of ancient Laconia
Historical regions in Greece